The 10th Alberta Legislative Assembly was in session from February 22, 1945, to July 16, 1948, with the membership of the assembly determined by the results of the 1944 Alberta general election held on August 8, 1944. The Legislature officially resumed on February 22, 1945, and continued until the fifth session was prorogued on March 31, 1948 and dissolved on July 16, 1948, prior to the 1948 Alberta general election.

Alberta's tenth government was controlled by the majority Social Credit Party for the third time, led by Premier Ernest Manning who would go on to be the longest serving Premier in Alberta history. The Official Opposition was led by John Percy Page a member of the Independent Citizen's Association. The Speaker was Peter Dawson who would serve until his death during the 15th legislature on March 24, 1963.

Premier Ernest Manning called a snap election in 1944 to gain a new mandate. He won a big majority, wiping out most of the Independents. Three members of Canadian Armed Forces entered the Legislature in a delayed vote held in 1945, filling seats especially reserved for overseas military personnel.

Standings changes in the 10th Assembly

References

Further reading

External links
Alberta Legislative Assembly
Legislative Assembly of Alberta Members Book
By-elections 1905 to present

10